Senator Cantine may refer to:

John Cantine (1735–1808), New York State Senate
Moses I. Cantine (1774–1823), New York State Senate